Emanuil is a male given name. It may refer to:

Emanuil A. Vidinski (born 1978), Bulgarian writer, poet, and musician
Emanuil Dyulgerov (born 1955), former hammer thrower from Bulgaria
Emanuil Gavriliță (1847–1910), lawyer, journalist and activist from Bessarabia
Emanuil Manolov (1860–1902), Bulgarian composer
Emanuil Vaskidovich (1795–1875), Bulgarian National Revival enlightener

See also
Emanuil Gojdu National College,high school located in Oradea, Romania
Ehmaniella
Emanu-El (disambiguation)
Emanuel (disambiguation)
Emanuele
Emmanuelle
Emmanuelli